Gardenia Stakes may refer to the following American Thoroughbred horse races:

 Gardenia Stakes (Garden State Park)
 Brave Raj Stakes or Gardenia Stakes at Calder Race Course
 Groupie Doll Stakes or Ellis Park Gardenia Stakes